Baghi is a 1956 Pakistani Urdu film directed by Ashfaq Malik. Sudhir, Musarrat Nazir, Allauddin, and Agha Talish were among the main cast. Inspired by the American film Apache (1954), it is considered as the first action film of Lollywood.

Plot
The film is based on true events from the time of the British rule in the Indian subcontinent.

Cast
 Sudhir played the role of Akbar 
Musarrat Nazir who played Mahesh 
 Yasmin
 Allauddin 
 Talish 
 Nazar
 Zeenat 
 Ghulam Mohammad
Sultan Rahi (extra)

Release and reception
The film was the first Pakistani film to be screened in China.

Production
The music for the film was composed by Rehman Verma, with song lyrics written by the poet Mushir Kazmi, Saghar Siddiqui and A.K. Musarrat. Munawar Sultana, Kausar Praveen, Zubaida Khanum, Pukhraj Pappu and Inayat Hussain Bhatti were the playback singers.

References

External links
 Baaghi at IMDb

Pakistani black-and-white films
Pakistani action films
1950s Urdu-language films
Urdu-language Pakistani films